Radalbuvir (INN, also known as GS-9669) is an experimental antiviral drug for the treatment of hepatitis C virus (HCV) infection developed by Gilead Sciences. Radalbuvir acts as an NS5B inhibitor. It is currently in clinical trials. It targets NS5B polymerase.

References

Antiviral drugs
Thiophenes
Carboxylic acids
Experimental drugs
Tetrahydrofurans
Alkyne derivatives
Cyclohexenes
Tert-butyl compounds
Ethers